Ahinoam Jesús Olvera Sánchez (born July 1, 1992, in Tepic, Nayarit) is a Mexican professional footballer who last played for Deportivo Tepic F.C.

References

1992 births
Living people
Mexican footballers
Coras de Nayarit F.C. footballers
Ascenso MX players
Liga Premier de México players
Tercera División de México players
Sportspeople from Tepic, Nayarit
Footballers from Nayarit
Association footballers not categorized by position